The 2005–06 season was Al-Minaa's 30th season in the Iraqi Premier League, having featured in all 32 editions of the competition except two. Al-Minaa participated in the Iraqi Premier League and the AFC Champions League.

They entered this season having finished in 2nd place in the league in the 2004–05 season, but this season was less successful as the club ranked in 10th place out of 28 teams. In the AFC Champions League, Al-Minaa were eliminated in the group stage where they earned their first ever points in an AFC competition with draws against Mash'al and Al-Hilal.

Squad

Iraqi Premier League

Summary table

Matches

Group stage

Elite stage

AFC Champions League

Group stage
<onlyinclude>

Statistics

Goalscorers

Last updated: 17 May 2006

Overall statistics

Last updated: 17 May 2006

References

External links
 Results of Al-Minaa SC on a FIFA.COM 
 Iraqi League 2005/2006
 Al-Minaa SC: Transfers and News

Al-Mina'a SC seasons